Dendropoma corrodens is a species of small sea snail, a marine gastropod mollusk in the family Vermetidae, the worm snails or worm shells.

Distribution
Found in the Gulf of Mexico and the Caribbean Sea.

Description 
The shell of this cemented species is usually not straight but coiled in one loose and irregular coil, however, the maximum recorded shell length is 10 mm.

Habitat 
The minimum recorded depth is 0 m; maximum recorded depth is 0 m.

References

Vermetidae
Gastropods described in 1841